A heatproof mat is a piece of apparatus commonly used in tabletop lab experiments that involve moderate temperatures (for example, when a Bunsen burner is being used) to prevent damage to a work surface. They may also be used for domestic equipment, such as hair straighteners, hair dryers or other hot objects.

Traditionally, such mats were made of asbestos, often reinforced with a metal mesh, but fiberglass or other substitutes are now used because of the toxicity of asbestos fibres.

Laboratory equipment